Speed skating at the 1980 Winter Olympics, was held from 9 February to 18 February. Nine events were contested at James B. Sheffield Olympic Skating Rink.

Medal summary

Medal table

The United States led the medal table with five gold medals, thanks to Eric Heiden's sweep of the men's events, which made him the first, and as of 2023, only, athlete to win five gold medals at a Winter Games.

Heiden led the individual medal table, while the most successful woman was Nataliya Petrusyova of the Soviet Union, who won one gold and one bronze medal. Leah Poulos-Mueller of the US won two silver medals.

Men's events

Women's events

Records

All previous Olympic records were broken in Lake Placid, along with one world record, from Eric Heiden in the final event, the men's 10000 metres.

Participating NOCs

Nineteen nations competed in the speed skating events at Lake Placid. China and Romania made their debuts in the sport.

References

 
1980 Winter Olympics events
1980
1980 in speed skating
Olympics, 1980